Bernesque poetry is a genre of satirical poetry that flourished during the Italian Renaissance. The style is named after Francesco Berni, an early pioneer of the style who popularized it across Europe.

Tropes 
Bernesque poetry is noted for its humorous and mocking tone, as well as its tendency to make light of serious or distressing situations. Bernesque poetry often relies on double meanings which are deployed in a masterful way-characteristically incarnated in food items or objects of daily use.

References 

Italian poetry
15th-century poetry
16th-century poetry
Genres of poetry